Leucopogon fletcheri is a species of flowering plant in the heath family Ericaceae and is endemic to south-eastern continental Australia. It is a densely-branched shrub with sharply-pointed oblong leaves, and pendent, tube-shaped white flowers in pairs in upper leaf axils.

Description

Taxonomy
Leucopogon fletcheri was first formally described in 1897 by Joseph Maiden and Ernst Betche in the Proceedings of the Linnean Society of New South Wales from specimens collected near Springwood by Joseph James Fletcher in September 1887.

In 1993, Jocelyn Marie Powell and G.Robertson described subspecies brevisepalus in the journal Telopea and the name, and that of the autonym, are accepted by the Australian Plant Census:

Distribution and habitat
This leucopogon grows in woodland in New South Wales, the Australian Capital Territory, and in montane and subalpine areas of eastern Victoria where it is known as Styphelia fletcheri subsp. brevisepala. Subspecies fletcheri grows in woodland and shrubland, but is restricted to the area between St Albans and Annangrove in north-western Sydney.

Conservation status
Leucopogon fletcheri is listed as "endangered" under the New South Wales Government Biodiversity Conservation Act 2016. The main threats to the subspecies include habitat loss and fragmentation, inappropriate fire regimes and weed invasion.

References

fletcheri
Ericales of Australia
Flora of New South Wales
Flora of Victoria (Australia)
Flora of the Australian Capital Territory
Plants described in 1897
Taxa named by Joseph Maiden
Taxa named by Ernst Betche